Ring is Miliyah Kato's fourth studio album. It was released on July 8, 2009. It contains singles, Sayonara Baby, 20: Cry, and her most successful single to date Love Forever. It was released in two editions, a CD Only and a CD+DVD edition which contains a DVD with the music videos of the singles and the first three episodes of the television drama for which 20-CRY- was the theme song. The album debuted at #2 on the Oricon Weekly Charts selling 150,000 units in its first week. This is Miliyah Kato's third album to debut within the top two and is her best-selling album to date.

Track listing

Charts

References 

2009 albums